The Deputy Chief Justice of the Constitutional Court of Indonesia is the second highest-ranking official serving on the Constitutional Court of Indonesia. Like the Chief Justice of the Constitutional Court of Indonesia, the Deputy Chief Justice is elected by the nine serving justices on the court from among their number.

In 2011, term limits for the Deputy Chief Justice as well as the Chief Justice were reduced from three years to two and a half years.

List of Deputy Chief Justices

References

See also

 Deputy Chief Justice of the Supreme Court of Indonesia

Justices of the Constitutional Court of Indonesia
Judiciary of Indonesia